The IPSC Swedish Shotgun Championship is an IPSC level 3 championship held once a year by the Swedish Dynamic Sports Shooting Association.

Champions 
The following is a list of current and previous champions.

Overall category

Lady category

Senior category

Team category

See also 
Swedish Handgun Championship
Swedish Mini Rifle Championship
Swedish Rifle Championship

References 

Match Results 2014 IPSC Swedish Shotgun Championship
Match Results 2015 IPSC Swedish Shotgun Championship
Match Results 2016 IPSC Swedish Shotgun Championship
Match Results 2017 IPSC Swedish Shotgun Championship

IPSC shooting competitions
National shooting championships
Sweden sport-related lists
Shooting competitions in Sweden